Clostridium arbusti  is an obligately anaerobic, Gram-positive and spore-forming bacterium from the genus Clostridium which has been isolated from pear orchard soil from Daejeon in Korea.

References

 

Bacteria described in 2010
arbusti